An  is an item officially classified as Tangible Cultural Property by the Japanese government's Agency for Cultural Affairs (Ministry of Education, Culture, Sports, Science and Technology) and judged to be of particular importance to the history, arts, and culture of the Japanese people.

Classification of Cultural Properties
To protect the cultural heritage of Japan, the Law for the Protection of Cultural Properties was created as a  under which important items are appropriated as Cultural Properties, thus imposing restrictions to their alteration, repair and export.

Cultural Properties are classified according to their nature. In this last case the designating agency is often not specified. Varying levels of designation can coexist. For example, Sankei-en, a traditional Japanese-style garden in Naka Ward, Yokohama, is both city and nationally designated as an Important Cultural Properties.

Examples

Lists of Important Cultural Properties of Japan
 List of Important Cultural Properties of Japan (Asuka period: structures)
 List of Important Cultural Properties of Japan (Nara period: structures)
 List of Important Cultural Properties of Japan (Heian period: structures)
 List of Important Cultural Properties of Japan (Kamakura period: structures)
 List of Important Cultural Properties of Japan (Shōwa period: structures)
 List of Important Cultural Properties of Japan (Okinawa: structures)

See also
 Cultural Properties of Japan

Notes

References

External links 

 
Cultural Properties of Japan
Heritage registers